Farouk Belkaïd (born 14 November 1977) is an Algerian former professional footballer who played as a defensive midfielder or as a defender.

Club career
Belkaïd was born in Bordj Menaïel. In 1998, he joined JS Kabylie  from JS Bordj Ménaïel. During his time with the club, he won the CAF Cup three times in a row from 2000 to 2002 and also won the league title in 2004.

In 2003, Belkaïd went on trial with French club AJ Auxerre but was not signed by manager Guy Roux.

International career
Belkaïd received his first call-up to the Algeria national team on 8 December 2000 for a friendly against Romania in Annaba, Algeria. He played the entire game, with the score ending 3–2 in favour of the visitors.

Career statistics

Club

International

|}

Honours
JS Kabylie
 CAF Cup: 2000, 2001, 2002
 Algerian Championnat National: 2003–04

MC Alger
 Algerian Cup: 2007
 Algerian Super Cup: 2006, 2007

ES Sétif
 Algerian Championnat National: 2008–09, 2011–12
 Algerian Cup: 2010, 2012
 North African Cup of Champions: 2009
 North African Super Cup: 2010
 North African Cup Winners Cup: 2010

Individual
 DZFoot d'Or: 2002

References

External links
 

1977 births
Living people
People from Bordj Menaïel
People from Bordj Menaïel District
People from Boumerdès Province
Kabyle people
Association football midfielders
Association football defenders
Algerian footballers
Algeria international footballers
JS Kabylie players
USM Alger players
MC Alger players
ES Sétif players
Algerian Ligue Professionnelle 1 players
JS Bordj Ménaïel players
RC Arbaâ players
21st-century Algerian people